Paul Derigubah (born April 23, 1963) is a Ghanaian politician and member of the Sixth Parliament of the Fourth Republic of Ghana representing the Jirapa Constituency in the Upper West Region as an independent.

Personal life 
Derigubah is a Christian (Catholic). He is married (with six children).

Early life and education 
Derigubah was born on April 23, 1963. He hails from Jirapa, a town in the Upper West Region of Ghana. He entered Agriculture University of, Wageningen, Netherlands and obtained his master's degree in Agriculture in 1985.

Politics 
Derigubah is an independent. In 2012, he contested for the Jirapa seat in the sixth parliament of the fourth republic and won.

Employment 
 Programme Specialist, United Nations Development Programme, Accra
 Farmer/agriculturist

References

1963 births
Living people
Independent politicians
Ghanaian MPs 2013–2017
Ghanaian MPs 2017–2021